The Billboard Latin Pop Airplay chart ranks the best-performing Spanish-language pop music singles in the United States. Published by Billboard magazine, the data are compiled by Nielsen SoundScan based on the audience impressions of each single's weekly airplay.

Chart history

References

United States Latin Pop
2011
2011 in Latin music